Michael William Deasy (born February 4, 1941) is an American rock and jazz guitarist.  As a session musician, he played on numerous hit singles and albums recorded in Los Angeles in the 1960s, 1970s and 1980s. He is sometimes credited as Mike Deasy Sr.

Biography
He was born and raised in Los Angeles, California, where he learned to play guitar as a child. While still at high school, he played in bands backing visiting musicians such as Ricky Nelson and The Everly Brothers, and also played in Ritchie Valens' touring band with Bruce Johnston, Larry Knechtel, Sandy Nelson, and Jim Horn.  After graduating in 1959, he joined Eddie Cochran's band, the Kelly Four, where he played both guitar and baritone sax and made his first recordings. He also played with The Coasters and Duane Eddy.

Following Cochran's death in 1960, he became an active session musician in Los Angeles after winning a Down Beat magazine collegiate jazz music scholarship in 1961. Deasy married Jim Horn's sister Kathie in 1961, and the couple later set up their own recording studio and production company, Saltmine Recording.  He worked as a member of "The Wrecking Crew", with Hal Blaine, Joe Osborn, Larry Knechtel and others, on sessions for Phil Spector, and contributed guitar parts to The Beach Boys' album Pet Sounds. In the 1960s and later years he also worked on records by the Monkees, the Association, Scott McKenzie, Johnny Rivers, the Fifth Dimension, Rick Nelson, Randy Newman, Spanky & Our Gang, Tommy Roe, Fats Domino, The Byrds, Michael Jackson, Helen Reddy, Frank Zappa, and others.

In 1967, he contributed to albums coordinated by record producer Curt Boettcher, including Friar Tuck and His Psychedelic Guitar, effectively a Deasy solo album with wordless vocals by Boettcher. Under the pseudonym Lybuk Hyd, Deasy also played guitar and sitar on the psychedelic concept album Tanyet, credited to The Ceyleib People, which also featured Ry Cooder.

Deasy played guitar (with Tommy Tedesco and Al Casey) on Elvis Presley's 1968 TV special, Elvis.  He also performed live with musicians including Cannonball Adderley and Little Richard. In 1969, he was invited by record producer Terry Melcher to work with a newly discovered singer-songwriter, Charles Manson. Deasy left Manson's home after three days, "in a state of drug-fueled paranoia".

Deasy continued to record with leading musicians, including Frank Sinatra, Ella Fitzgerald, Barbra Streisand, Chet Baker, and Mel Tormé. His guitar playing has appeared on the soundtrack of many films including The Graduate, Guess Who's Coming to Dinner, Duel, Bullitt, and Dirty Harry, as well as on many commercials.

From the early 1970s onwards after becoming a born again Christian at the 1969 Billy Graham crusade in Anaheim, California, Deasy became increasingly involved with Contemporary Christian music, producing and writing songs for several successful albums, often in conjunction with his wife.  In later years, he has had a parallel career as a motivational speaker, and since 1988 has run a "Yes To Life" educational and inspirational program in schools and colleges in the US, Canada and Europe. The Deasys also co-pastored Rock Church Southeast in Port Arthur, Texas, until it eventually shut its doors when Hurricane Harvey flooded the building.

Discography 
 Your Gang (Mercury, 1966)
 Tanyet (Vault, 1967)
 Friar Tuck and His Psychedelic Guitar (Mercury, 1967)
 Gator Creek (Mercury, 1970)
 Letters to My Head (Capitol, 1973)
 Wings of an Eagle (Sparrow, 1976)
 Wings of Praise (Saltmine, 1987)
 Holy Smoke (Saltmine, 1991)
 Tru Love (Saltmine, 1994)
 Guitar Gold (Saltmine, 1995)
 Signs and Wonders (Saltmine, 1999)
 Paper Airplane (Saltmine, 2000)
 Path of Peace Vol. 1 (Saltmine, 2003)
 Path of Peace Vol. 2 (Saltmine, 2003)
 Endtimes Weather Band (Saltmine, 2011)
 Driftin''' (Saltmine, 2013)
 The Road Home Vol. 1 (Saltmine)
 The Road Home Vol. 2'' (Saltmine)

Partial credits as a sideman

Film and Television

References

External links
Discography at mikedeasysdiscography.blogspot.com
The Bartell Fretless story www.findingfretless.com 

1941 births
American male singer-songwriters
American performers of Christian music
American rock guitarists
American male guitarists
American rock singers
American rock songwriters
American male saxophonists
American session musicians
Capitol Records artists
Lead guitarists
Living people
Performers of Christian rock music
Sitar players
Singer-songwriters from California
Sparrow Records artists
The Wrecking Crew (music) members
20th-century American guitarists
20th-century American saxophonists
Guitarists from Los Angeles
21st-century American saxophonists
20th-century American male musicians
21st-century American male musicians